The zukra (zokra, zoughara) is a Libyan bagpipe with a double-chanter terminating in two cow horns; it is similar in construction to the Tunisian mizwad.

The instrument is played as a bagpipe in the south and west of Libya, but played by mouth without a bag in the east.  The instrument is played at feasts, weddings, and funerals.

See also
Mizwad
Gaida
Rhaita
Mizmar (instrument)

References

External links
Image of a zukra player in a band, in 

Bagpipes
North African musical instruments
Libyan musical instruments
Arabic musical instruments
Double-reed instruments